Noah Mann junior (1783 at Northchapel, Sussex – 1825 in London) was an English professional cricketer.  His father was Noah Mann of Hambledon.

Career
Mann was mainly associated with Marylebone Cricket Club (MCC), being engaged on the club's ground staff for several seasons.  He made 9 known appearances in first-class matches from 1807 to 1818.

References

External sources
 CricketArchive record

1783 births
1825 deaths
English cricketers
English cricketers of 1787 to 1825
Marylebone Cricket Club cricketers
Epsom cricketers
E. H. Budd's XI cricketers
William Ward's XI cricketers
Lord Frederick Beauclerk's XI cricketers
People from Northchapel